Milan Živadinović (Serbian Cyrillic: Милан Живадиновић; born 13 April 1992) is a Serbian footballer who plays as midfielder for Lao League side Lanexang United.

Club career

Mladi Radnik
In February, 2011, it was announced that Živadinović signed a 3-year contract with Mladi Radnik.

Lanexang United
On February 1, 2015, it was announced that Milan signed a year contract with Lanexang United.

References

1992 births
Living people
Sportspeople from Požarevac
Serbian footballers
Serbian expatriate footballers
Serbian SuperLiga players
Association football midfielders
Lanexang United F.C. players
FK Mladi Radnik players
FK Rudar Kostolac players
FK Sloga Petrovac na Mlavi players